is a Japanese politician of the Democratic Party of Japan, a member of the House of Councillors in the Diet (national legislature). A native of Takeno, Hyogo and graduate of Nara University of Education, he was elected to represent the Hyogo at-large district in 2004 and was re-elected in 2010.

References

External links 
  in Japanese.

Members of the House of Councillors (Japan)
1956 births
Living people
Democratic Party of Japan politicians